Samuel Cobb may refer to:

 Samuel Cobb (poet) (c. 1675–1713), English poet, school master, classicist, and translator of Chaucer
 Samuel C. Cobb (1826–1891), American politician, Mayor of Boston

See also
 Samuel Cobb House, Portland, Oregon
 USNS Samuel L. Cobb (T-AOT-1123), an American transport ship